Kabir Kuh (Kurdish: کڤەر -Kiver) is one of the long ranges of the Zagros Mountains near the border of Lurestan and Ilam Provinces in Ilam province, Iran. Made mainly by Cretaceous sedimentary rocks, the Kabir Kuh range consists of a large number of mountains, including Shah Ahmad, Tabriz, Kaleh-bad, Filman, Damaghey-e Anar, Rivasan, Puneh, Sabzkhani, Zarrin, Golgol that are covered by snow and ice all year round. Kabir Kuh runs along the Seymareh River, which becomes Karkheh when joins the Kashkan river before reaching the border of Ilam province and Khuzestan province. Kabir Kuh divides the mountainous region in western Iran into two regions generally referred as Piškuh (eastern side) and Poštkuh (western side), the latter virtually coinciding with Ilam. In prehistoric times, one of the largest known landslides occurred on the north-eastern slope of Kabir Kouh, moving across the Seymareh River.

The eastern side is dominated by steep slopes where water and wooded valleys abound. The western side is, however, quite dry but rich in oil reservoirs and underground resources.

References

Landforms of Ilam Province
Mountain ranges of Iran